Jefferson Patterson (14 May 1891–12 November 1977) was an American diplomat who served as United States Ambassador to Uruguay under Dwight D. Eisenhower, from 1956 to 1958. He married Mary Marvin Breckinridge Patterson in 1940. He also had assignments in Berlin, Belgium, Egypt, Greece, and the UN Special Committee on the Balkans. He also wrote a book, Diplomatic Duty and Diversion. Patterson additionally worked at the U.S. Embassy in Paris during World War II, and was in charge of French prisoners of war before the transfer of protecting power from the United States to Vichy France.

Family
His father, Frank Jefferson Patterson, co-founded National Cash Register.
Mother, Julia Shaw Patterson Carnell (1863-1944). She later married Harry G. Carnell (1858–1931).
Sister, Mary Patterson Davidson (1894-1950), married to Major General Howard C. Davidson (1890-1984).
Wife, Mary Marvin Breckinridge Patterson.

See also
Jefferson Patterson Park & Museum

References

External links
Biography from the Jefferson Patterson Park & Museum website
Jefferson Patterson papers, 1824-1981, Manuscript Division, Library of Congress, Washington, D.C.

1891 births
1977 deaths
Ambassadors of the United States to Uruguay
People from Dayton, Ohio
Place of death missing